Amsterdam Aletta Jacobslaan was a planned railway station in Amsterdam, Netherlands. The station was to be built on the Amsterdam–Schiphol railway on the site of the current Henk Sneevlietweg—a station on the Amsterdam Metro.

Proposed railway stations in the Netherlands
Aletta Jacobslaan